Mikal Cronin is the first solo album from Moonhearts bassist Mikal Cronin.  He had previously released the 2009 album Reverse Shark Attack in conjunction with Ty Segall.  Uncut placed it at number 45 on its list of the "Top 50 Albums of 2011".

Track listing
 "Is It Alright" – 3:29
 "Apathy" – 2:39
 "Green & Blue" – 3:37
 "Get Along" – 3:53
 "Slow Down" – 2:00
 "Gone" – 3:55
 "Situation" – 1:56
 "Again & Again" – 4:16
 "Hold on Me" – 3:06
 "The Way Things Go" – 5:15

References

2011 debut albums
Mikal Cronin albums